Rafael Rogerio da Silva (born 30 November 1995), commonly known as Rafael Ratão, is a Brazilian professional footballer who plays as a forward for  club Toulouse.

Career
Born in Cascavel, Paraná, Ratão has played in Brazil for Ponte Preta, Penapolense (twice), Santos, Boa and Guaratinguetá.

In August 2015, Ratão joined Japanese club Albirex Niigata on loan until January 2016.

Career statistics

Honours
Slovan Bratislava
Fortuna Liga: 2018–19, 2019–20, 2020–21
Slovnaft Cup: 2019–20, 2020–21

Toulouse
 Ligue 2: 2021–22

References

External links
 
 
 Rafael Ratão at playmakerstats.com (English version of ogol.com.br)
 
 
 

1995 births
Living people
Sportspeople from Paraná (state)
Brazilian footballers
Campeonato Brasileiro Série A players
Campeonato Brasileiro Série B players
J1 League players
K League 2 players
Ukrainian Premier League players
Slovak Super Liga players
Ligue 1 players
Ligue 2 players
Associação Atlética Ponte Preta players
Boa Esporte Clube players
Santos FC players
Guaratinguetá Futebol players
Albirex Niigata players
Chungju Hummel FC players
FC Zorya Luhansk players
ŠK Slovan Bratislava players
Toulouse FC players
Brazilian expatriate footballers
Brazilian expatriate sportspeople in South Korea
Expatriate footballers in South Korea
Brazilian expatriate sportspeople in Japan
Expatriate footballers in Japan
Association football forwards
Brazilian expatriate sportspeople in Ukraine
Expatriate footballers in Ukraine
Brazilian expatriate sportspeople in Slovakia
Expatriate footballers in Slovakia
Brazilian expatriate sportspeople in France
Expatriate footballers in France